Center Township is a township in 
Henry County, Iowa, USA.

References

Henry County, Iowa
Townships in Iowa